Amber is an Irish television crime drama series, created by Rob Cawley and Paul Duane and directed by Thaddeus O'Sullivan, that broadcast across four consecutive nights on RTÉ One from 19 to 22 January 2014. The series stars Eva Birthistle and David Murray as parents of a young teenage girl, Amber Bailey (Lauryn Canny), who disappears after being dropped off by her father at a friends' house in Dublin.

Amber was produced by Screenworks Ireland for RTÉ, with funding from the Broadcasting Authority of Ireland. The series was produced in 2011, and following a distribution deal with Content Media Corporation, the series broadcast in Denmark, Sweden, Israel, Latin America, Brazil, Canada and Australia before premiering in its native country.

The series broadcast on BBC Four in the UK in June 2014, airing on Fridays in a graveyard slot. The series is also available on Netflix in some regions, and is available to stream on Amazon Video in the UK. A Region 2 DVD was issued via Arrow Films on 30 June 2014. The series has received mixed reviews from critics.

Cast

Main
 Eva Birthistle as Sarah Bailey; mother of Amber and Eamon and estranged wife of Ben
 David Murray as Ben Bailey; father of Amber and Eamon, estranged husband of Sarah and CEO of a security firm
 Justine Mitchell as Maeve Flynn-Dunne; best friend of Sarah and a newspaper reporter
 David Herlihy as Declan McCarthy; friend of Ben and co-director of the same security firm
 Emily Nagle as Sgt. Karen Mulcahy; friend of Ben and Sarah and one of the police officers investigating Amber's disappearance
 Declan Conlon as D.I. Rob Dunlop; friend of Ben and the lead inspector investigating Amber's disappearance
 Lauryn Canny as Amber Bailey; 14-year-old artistic daughter of Sarah and Ben, who disappears on her way home from the city
 Levi O'Sullivan as Eamon Bailey; youngest child of Sarah and Ben, and Amber's brother
 Gary Whelan as Supt. Jack Stirrat; commanding officer overseeing the investigation into Amber's disappearance
 Ned Dennehy as Terrence O'Donoghue; a prisoner who tells Maeve he has information pertaining to Amber's disappearance
 Dan Li as Charlie; an illegal immigrant from China who volunteers to help search for Amber
 Noel Gaskin as 'Dog Man'; an unidentified perp seen talking to Amber a day or so before her disappearance
 Shauna Griffith as Jenny; Amber's best friend
 Andrew Mullan as Manga-Boy; Amber's secret boyfriend

Supporting

 Stella McCusker as Trish
 Laura Jane Laughlin as Cherry 
 Eleanor Methven as Margaret 
 Janice Byrne as Gemma 
 Eric Lalor as Bernard 
 Stephen Jones as Squeak 
 Vinny Murphy as Larry
 Aenne Barr as Deirdre Costello
 Jane McGrath as Natalie Costello
 Deirdre Donnelly as Maureen O'Donoghue
 Shashi Rami as Dev
 Craig Kenny as Milligan
 Gabriela Duane as Gabi
 Mirjana Rendulic as Jolanta
 Michael Liebman as Martin
 Ronan Leahy as Mark

Episodes

References

External links
 

Irish television shows
2014 Irish television series debuts
2014 Irish television series endings